Army General Administrative Instruction 67 (AGAI 67) is a British Army administrative disciplinary procedure.  It has come under criticism in a report to the Defence Select Committee which described it as being unfairly weighted in the favour of the chain of command, and lacking transparency or accountability.

References

See also 
 Offences against military law in the United Kingdom

United Kingdom military law